A River Runs Through It and Other Stories is a semi-autobiographical collection of three stories by American author Norman Maclean (1902–1990) published in 1976. It was the first work of fiction published by the University of Chicago Press.

The collection contains the novella "A River Runs Through It" and two short stories, "Logging and Pimping and 'Your pal, Jim'" and "USFS 1919: The Ranger, the Cook, and a Hole in the Sky", which precede the events of the novella. It received widespread acclaim upon its publication and was nominated for the Pulitzer Prize in Letters in 1977, but the selection committee ultimately did not award the prize in that category that year. Two of the stories were later adapted into feature films.

"A River Runs Through It"

"A River Runs Through It" is a semi-autobiographical account of Maclean's relationship with his brother Paul and their upbringing in an early 20th century Montana family in which "there was no clear line between religion and fly fishing." Pete Dexter, in a 1981 profile of Maclean in Esquire magazine, described the novella:

As he describes his brother's alcoholism and gambling addiction, Maclean also explores how both afflictions have always followed the history of his family, even back to their earliest origins among Scottish Gaelic-speaking Presbyterians on the Isle of Mull.

The story is noted for using detailed descriptions of fishing and the Montana landscape to engage with a number of profound metaphysical questions. In a review for the Chicago Tribune, critic Alfred Kazin stated: "There are passages here of physical rapture in the presence of unsullied primitive America that are as beautiful as anything in Thoreau and Hemingway".

"Logging and Pimping and 'Your pal, Jim'"

"Logging and Pimping and 'Your pal, Jim'" tells the story of Maclean working as a logger for the Anaconda Company at a logging camp on the Blackfoot River during the summer of 1928, when he was 25 and in graduate school. At the end of the previous summer working at the camp (1927), Maclean had made an arrangement to work the next summer with the camp's best logger, Jim Grierson. Maclean describes how Grierson would work the logging season at a camp, then find a town with a nice Carnegie Public Library, get a library card, find a prostitute, preferably from the South, and spend the off-season reading, drinking, and having a relationship with the woman.

"USFS 1919: The Ranger, the Cook, and a Hole in the Sky"

"USFS 1919: The Ranger, the Cook, and a Hole in the Sky" tells of part of the summer of Maclean's 17th year, 1919. He spent that summer, as he had the previous two, working for the United States Forest Service, this time at Elk Summit, Idaho, west of Blodgett Canyon and approximately  walking distance almost due west-northwest of Hamilton, Montana, near White Sand Creek, and north of East Fork Moose Creek.

Working for the Forest Service in a very remote part of the Selway-Bitterroot Wilderness in the Selway National Forest (now Clearwater National Forest), Maclean had to extinguish wildfires, build trails (with a sledgehammer, chisel, and dynamite), pack horses and mules, spend time alone on lookout duty at  Grave Peak, and string telephone wire.

Publishing history

A River Runs Through It and Other Stories was first published by the University of Chicago Press in May 1976. The same press has published two illustrated editions of the title novella: a 1983 edition with photographs by Joel Snyder and a 1989 edition with woodcuts by Barry Moser, which remains in print.  With the release of Robert Redford's film adaptation of A River Runs through It, the University of Chicago Press licensed a mass-market, movie tie-in edition to Pocket Books and released a trade paperback edition with a re-designed cover featuring a painting by Russell Chatham. In 2001, the University of Chicago Press published a twenty-fifth anniversary edition of A River Runs through It and Other Stories with a foreword by Annie Proulx. In 2017, the press replaced that edition with one featuring a foreword by Robert Redford.

Pulitzer Prize
In 1977, the Pulitzer Prize committee for Fiction (a.k.a. "fiction jury") recommended A River Runs Through It be awarded the prize for that year. The Pulitzer Prize Board, which has final say for awarding the prize, chose to override their recommendation and decided not to award for fiction that year. Pete Dexter wrote in 1981 that the board called it "a lean year for fiction" but speculated about their true reasons: "I know just enough about the Pulitzer people to guess that what happened was that one of them noticed the trees too."

Adaptations

A River Runs Through It

In 1992, Robert Redford directed a film of the same name starring Brad Pitt, Craig Sheffer, Tom Skerritt, Brenda Blethyn, and Emily Lloyd. It was nominated for three Academy Awards, with Philippe Rousselot winning for his cinematography. The film fueled a rise in the popularity of fly fishing for a number of years before the sport waned to previous levels.

The Ranger, the Cook and a Hole in the Sky

"USFS 1919: The Ranger, the Cook, and a Hole in the Sky" was adapted into a 1995 ABC television film titled The Ranger, the Cook and a Hole in the Sky, also known simply as Hole in the Sky. The film was directed by John Kent Harrison, with the adaptation written by Robert Wayne, and stars Sam Elliott, Jerry O'Connell, Ricky Jay, and Molly Parker. It was filmed in British Columbia, Canada.

Others

The following quote from the film version of A River Runs Through It, which is not present in the novella, is displayed at the base of the statue of Michael Jordan at Chicago's United Center:

"At that moment I knew, surely and clearly, that I was witnessing perfection. He stood before us, suspended above the earth, free from all its laws like a work of art, and I knew, just as surely and clearly, that life is not a work of art, and that the moment could not last."

References

External links
Excerpt from "A River Runs Through It" – University of Chicago Press
Norman Maclean: Of Scholars, Fishing and the River by John G. Cawelti

1976 American novels
American autobiographical novels
American novellas
University of Chicago Press books
American novels adapted into films